Daniel Richard Powter (born February 25, 1971) is a Canadian musician and a songwriter. He is best known for his self-penned hit song "Bad Day" (2005), which was top of the Billboard Hot 100 for five weeks.

Biography

Early life
Powter grew up in Vernon, in the Okanagan-Shuswap region of British Columbia, alongside 2 brothers and a sister. As a child, Powter played the violin at the age of 4. He changed to piano at 16 years old after a group of children bullied him in the schoolyard, trashed and destroyed his violin. Due to dyslexia, Powter had trouble in university reading music, and dropped out at the age of 20 in order to pursue his own musical career, learning all songs by ear and recording new melodies that he created. He started writing songs when he was 13 years old.

Powter moved to Vancouver at the age of 22 and met producer Jeff Dawson in 1997 and released his debut studio album, I'm Your Betty, on June 21, 2000. The album, limited to a very small print, contains ten songs, two of which—"More Than I" and "Negative Fashion"—were both featured on the television show Higher Ground in the episode "Wherefore Art Thou".

Self-titled album (2005–2006)

Powter's first single, "Bad Day", was first released in Europe in mid-2005, in advance of his second album, Daniel Powter. Warner Bros. Records submitted the single for commercials, and it was subsequently chosen by Coca-Cola as the theme song for an ad campaign in Europe. The song achieved heavy airplay in most European countries, peaking at number three on the overall European airplay chart. It reached number one on national airplay in Germany, number one on the singles charts in the Republic of Ireland and Italy, number two in the United Kingdom—where it stayed in the top ten for thirteen weeks—and number three in Australia.

In the United States, "Bad Day" was used extensively on the television series American Idol in its fifth season. Powter sang the song live at the end of the final show of that season on May 23, 2006. The song reached number one on the Billboard Hot 100, Adult Top 40 and Adult Contemporary charts, making Powter the first solo Canadian male artist to top the Hot 100 since Bryan Adams in 1995 (with "Have You Ever Really Loved a Woman?"). The song also reached number one in Powter's homeland, Canada.

On May 31, 2005, Powter released his first extended play known as "Free Loop."

On July 2, 2005, Powter performed at the Berlin installment of Live 8, a simultaneous group of concerts in nine countries intended to raise awareness of poverty in Africa and put pressure on world leaders for aid.

"Bad Day" came in fifth in the British Record of the Year 2005. In 2006, Powter won in the New Artist of the Year category at the Canadian Juno Awards, and was nominated for Best International Breakthrough Act at the BRIT Awards. "Bad Day" was nominated at the 2006 Billboard Music Awards for Hot 100 Single of the Year, and was named Billboard magazine's song of the year in 2006. At the 2007 Grammy Awards, Powter received a Best Male Pop Vocal Performance nomination for the song.

The subsequent singles from Daniel Powter – "Jimmy Gets High", "Free Loop", and "Lie to Me" – were released in different parts of the world, each failing to match the success of "Bad Day". "Free Loop" was deemed chart ineligible in the UK (as the release included a version of "Bad Day" as a B-side whilst "Bad Day" was still in the chart, hence breaking chart rules) and failed to chart in the U.S., though it reached the top forty on the Adult Contemporary chart. Following the release of "Lie to Me", "Jimmy Gets High" was to be the fourth single from the album in the UK, but its release was cancelled. A new track called "Love You Lately" was released as the next U.S. single, preceding a re-release of the album Daniel Powter that was also cancelled. Powter was never able to have another major hit after "Bad Day" and never cracked the U.S. Hot 100 again.

Later career (2008–present)
In March 2008, a song by Japanese singer Haru featuring Powter, "Find My Way", was released. In September, Powter released his third album, Under the Radar. This was the same year in which he embarked on the Wolfbaggin' Tour, joining the likes of Alphabeat and Lil Chris.

Powter also performed piano on tracks for what was scheduled to be Marcy Playground frontman John Wozniak's solo album, Leaving Wonderland... in a Fit of Rage, but the album was released under the band's name.  Powter was still given credit for his contributions to the song "Gin and Money".

On March 16, 2009, Powter performed at the Montreux Jazz Festival then in December 2009, Powter was named as the decade's top One-Hit Wonder by Billboard.  The magazine describes one-hit wonders as acts whose second hit did not reach the top 25; they only included acts from 2000 to 2007.  In Powter's case, "Bad Day" is his only Hot 100 hit.

On January 1, 2010, he performed O Canada at the NHL Winter Classic. In that same year, he released his greatest hits album, Best of Me, and with it, recorded three new songs and a new version of the title track to go along with 'Bad Day', 'Jimmy Gets High', 'Next Plane Home' and his other singles. Only one was released as a single: 'Lose To Win', on November 10, 2010.

On December 1, 2010, Powter made a tribute to English singer and songwriter John Lennon with his cover version of Happy Xmas (War Is Over). This single was released in Europe, the UK and Japan.

Powter again failed to re-capture the success of "Bad Day." In 2011, he took a hiatus.

On April 10, 2012, Powter's new single "Cupid" was released to US and Canadian iTunes stores. Powter's latest album, Turn on the Lights, was released in July 2012.

On June 13, 2012, Powter also made a tribute to L'Arc-en-Ciel with his variation of the song "Stay Away".

On September 10, 2012, he released "Crazy All My Life".

On December 5, 2012, Powter was featured in a song with Japanese singer May J. titled "Back To Your Heart". On the 18 he released the single "Christmas Cupid", which is a Christmas version of his song "Cupid".

On June 5, 2013, Powter announced on Twitter that he was working on a new album with Jeff Dawson, who co-produced most of his songs in the past, and John Fields, who was a co-writer on "Crazy All My Life". He also said:

On July 15, 2013, Powter performed at the National Association of Drug Court Professionals performing "Bad Day" and "Whole World Around." Matthew Perry also attended the event.

On August 9, 2013, he performed at the Festival of Friends.

On September 5, 2013, Powter later released 4 new songs as bonus tracks for his album Turn on the Lights called Ur My Radio, Doesn't Matter, Cheers To Us and Goodbye.

On November 27, 2016, Powter performed at The 39th Jazz Goes To Campus Festival performing Bad Day.

On January 6, 2017, Powter released a new single called "Delicious" featuring Australian singer Vanessa Amorosi. The music video was uploaded to his official YouTube channel on March 14, 2017.

On December 10, 2017, Powter performed at the President's Star Charity event in Singapore singing Bad Day and joined Sandra Riley Tang in a duet performing her band's song "Save Myself."

On April 6, 2018, Powter released a new single called "Perfect For Me." On April 13, he released his fourth extended play known as Daniel Powter. There are 4 songs in this album: a remastered remix of Bad Day, Tell Them Who You Are in an acoustic version, his 2017 single "Delicious" and his 2018 single "Perfect For Me."

On September 21, 2018, Powter released a single known as "Do You Wanna Get Lucky" It was followed by another called "Survivor" released on October 26 and Perfect for Me was later re-recorded and released on November 23 for the Asia market.

He released an album called Giants on December 14 where songs in the album include the re-recording of "Perfect For Me", "Survivor", "Delicious", re-recordings of "Bad Day", "Free Loop" and "Tell Them Who You Are" (from the EP). A remixed version of "Do You Wanna Get Lucky" is also included known as the Holiday version.

Powter went on to feature with The Untamed Boys, a Chinese pop group, in January 2020, where they released the song "The Beauty of Following Our Hearts." and performed it alongside "Bad Day" while touring in Bangkok, Thailand. Powter also collaborated with other artists in the MOSHIMO Project in May 2020.

On February 3, 2021, Powter was featured in a song called "Save Your Life" with Japanese pop singer Ayaka Hirahara.

Powter performed at TriNet Peopleforce on September 16, 2021, with the new song "Brave" which became downloadable on October 7. Bad Day was later released as a new single on October 30, 2021.

On November 19, 2021, he released his third compilation album known as "The Essential Collection" consisting of 32 songs all from his previous albums: Daniel Powter, B-Sides, Under the Radar and Best of Me.

Powter then collaborated with Patricia Kelly with "Brave" in a duet. This version was released as part of her album Unbreakable on December 30, 2021. The music video of the song was later released and added to her YouTube channel on February 19, 2022.

On August 1, 2022, he released a lyrics video version of "Bad Day" on his official YouTube channel.

Personal life
Powter lived in Los Angeles, California for 20 years until 2021, while he currently lives in Oregon. He has three children: two daughters and one son. He is divorced.

Powter disclosed in July 2013 that he was sexually abused by a female babysitter for three years starting from age 7 and turned to drugs and alcohol to get over his guilt and shame. He said in an interview

When Powter is not making music he enjoys spending time with his children and his hobbies include fly fishing, yoga, surfing and reading Raymond Carver short stories.

Powter is a fan of the NHL. As a kid he was a fan of the Edmonton Oilers and is now a Los Angeles Kings fan, with season tickets.

Musical influences
Powter spoken of his musical influences growing up:

Awards and nominations
{| class=wikitable
|-
! Year !! Awards !! Work !! Category !! Result
|-
| rowspan="7"| 2005
| MTV Europe Music Awards
| rowspan=3|Himself
| Best New Act
| 
|-
| rowspan=4|Žebřík Music Awards
| Best International Male
| 
|-
| Best International Surprise
| 
|-
| rowspan="11"| "Bad Day"
| Best International Song
| 
|-
| Best International Video
| 
|-
| The Record of the Year
| Record of the Year
| 
|-
| SOCAN Awards
| Best Pop Song 
| 
|-
| rowspan="11"| 2006
| Tokio Hot 100 Awards
| Best Song 
| 
|-
| BMI Pop Awards
| Pop Award
| 
|-
| rowspan="3"| Billboard Music Awards
| Top Hot 100 Song
| 
|-
| Digital Song of the Year 
| 
|-
| Pop 100 Song of the Year
| 
|-
| APRA Music Awards
| Most Performed Foreign Work 
| 
|-
| MuchMusic Video Awards
| MuchMoreMusic Award
| 
|-
| Teen Choice Awards
| rowspan="4"| Himself
| Choice Music: Breakout Artist - Male
| 
|-
| Canadian Radio Music Awards
| Best New Group or Solo Artist—Mainstream AC
| 
|-
| Juno Awards
| New Artist of the Year
| 
|-
| Brit Awards
| International Breakthrough Act
| 
|-
| rowspan="9"| 2007
| Grammy Awards
| rowspan="4"| "Bad Day"
| Best Male Pop Vocal Performance
| 
|-
| Kids' Choice Awards
| Favorite Song 
| 
|-
| Groovevolt Music & Fashion Awards
| Best Pop Song Performance - Male
| 
|-
| rowspan="2"| MTV Video Music Awards Japan
| Best Male Video
| 
|-
| rowspan="2"| Daniel Powter
| Album of the Year
| 
|-
| rowspan="4"| Japan Gold Disc Awards
| Best 3 Albums
| 
|-
| rowspan="2"| Himself
| New Artist of the Year 
| 
|-
| International Artist of the Year 
| 
|-
| "Bad Day"
| International Song of the Year 
|

Discography

Studio albums

Compilation albums

Extended plays

Singles

As lead artist

As featured artist

Promotional singles

Music videos

Music covers

Notes

References

External links

 Official website

1971 births
Canadian pop pianists
Canadian pop singers
Juno Award for Breakthrough Artist of the Year winners
Living people
Musicians from British Columbia
People from Vernon, British Columbia
Warner Records artists
Musicians with dyslexia
Canadian male pianists
21st-century Canadian pianists
21st-century Canadian male singers
Writers with dyslexia